Wallace Luther Knerr (August 21, 1921 – March 23, 1980) was a Major League Baseball player who played pitcher from 1945 to 1947. He played for the Philadelphia Athletics and Washington Senators.

External links

1921 births
1980 deaths
Major League Baseball pitchers
Philadelphia Athletics players
Washington Senators (1901–1960) players
Muhlenberg Mules baseball players
Baseball players from Pennsylvania
People from Strasburg, Pennsylvania
Albany Senators players
Chattanooga Lookouts players
Danville Leafs players
Jersey City Giants players
Newport News Pilots players
Petersburg Rebels players
Sherbrooke Athletics players
Shreveport Sports players
Toronto Maple Leafs (International League) players
American expatriate baseball players in Canada